Edax or EDAX may refer to:

Species
 Alopecosa edax, a species of wolf spider
 Andean mouse (Andinomys edax)
 Copelatus edax, a species of diving beetle
 Greedy olalla rat (Olallamys edax)
 Hypatopa edax, a species of moth in the family Blastobasidae
 Ithome edax, a species of moth in the family Cosmopterigidae
 Nabis edax, a species of damsel bug

Other uses 
 Energy-dispersive analysis X-ray, an alternative name for Energy-dispersive X-ray spectroscopy 
 Edax (computing), a computer Othello program
 Charles Lamb (1775–1834)
 Rechlin-Lärz Airfield (ICAO code EDAX), in Germany